The Isle of Man Division 2 is the second division of the Isle of Man Football League and the second highest in the Isle of Man Football League System. The winners and the runners-up of division 2 get promoted to the Isle of Man Premier League, with the two bottom football clubs from the Premier League relegated to division 2. The league is overseen by the Isle of Man Football Association.

Division 2 clubs are eligible of competing in the Isle of Man FA Cup and Hospital Cup. The second division also holds its own cup competitions, these are the Woods Memorial Cup and the Gold Cup.

Current members 
The following 13 clubs are competing in Division 2 during the 2019-20 season.

 Ayre United
 Braddan
 Colby
 Douglas and District
 Foxdale
 Governors Athletic
 Gymnasium
 Malew
 Michael United
 Onchan
 Ramsey Youth Centre and Old Boys
 St Johns United
 Union Mills

See also 

 List of association football competitions
 Football in the Isle of Man
 Isle of Man Football League

References 

Football competitions in the Isle of Man